Harris v. Arizona Independent Redistricting Commission, 578 U.S. ___ (2016), was a United States Supreme Court case in which the Court held that the one person, one vote principle under the Equal Protection Clause of the Fourteenth Amendment allows a state's redistricting commission slight variances in drawing of legislative districts provided that the variance does not exceed 10 percent. The Court found that the map, created by a bipartisan commission on the basis of the 2010 census, was constitutional.

See also
Evenwel v. Abbott 
Reynolds v. Sims — a United States Supreme Court case that ruled that state legislature districts had to be roughly equal in population.

References

External links
 
Scotusblog

United States electoral redistricting case law
United States One Person, One Vote Legal Doctrine
United States Supreme Court cases
United States Supreme Court cases of the Roberts Court
2016 in United States case law
Redistricting in the United States
Congressional districts of Arizona